is a Japanese actress.

Biography
Tanaka started appearing on stage as a child. She won an award at Toho's Cinderella contest in 1996 and landed the starring role in the NHK Asadora Aguri in 1997, which significantly launched her career. She would later play Kirko Tsujimori in Godzilla vs. Megaguirus (2000), and even have a cameo appearance in Godzilla Against Mechagodzilla (2002) as Nurse Tsujimori.

Filmography

Films
 The Black House (1999)
 Godzilla vs. Megaguirus (2000) – Kirko Tsujimori
 Misuzu (2001) – Misuzu Kaneko
 Godzilla Against Mechagodzilla (2002) – Nurse
 Crying Out Love in the Center of the World (2004) – Ritsuko's Mother
 Tantei Jimusho 5: 5 Number de Yobareru Tanteitachi no Monogatari (2005)
 Bride of Noto (2008)
 Cobalt Blue (2009)
 Quartet! (2012)
 From Kobe (2015)
 Sadako vs. Kayako (2016) – Fumiko Takagi
 Ashita ni Kakeru Hashi (2018)
 Ninomiya Kinjirō (2018) – Nami
 The Dignified Death of Shizuo Yamanaka (2020) – Sachiko Imai
 Go! Go! Sakura Club (2023)
 From Spice with Love (2023)

Television

Series
 Agri (NHK / 1997)
 Best Partner (TBS / 1997)
 With Love (Fuji TV / 1998)
 The One Stringed Harp | Ichigen no Koto (NHK / 2000)
 Toshiie to Matsu (NHK / 2002) – Oichi
 Midnight Rain | Mayonaka no Ame (TBS / 2002)
 Korogashi Ogin (NHK / 2003)
 New Woman of the Crime Lab 6 | Shin Kasouken no Onna (TV Asahi / 2005) – ep.2* Sono otoko, fuku shocho: Kyoto kawara machi sho jiken fyairu (2007)
 Romeo and Juliet (2007)
 Sono otoko, fuku shocho: Season 2 (2008)
 FACE-MAKER (NTV-YTV / 2010) – ep.12,13
 Detective Conan: Kudo Shinichi e no Chousenjou | Meitantei Conan: Kudo Shinichi e no Chousenjou (NTV-YTV / 2011) – Chisato Nagata (ep.5)
 The Pioneers | Kaitakushatachi (NHK / 2012) – Junko Yoshizaki
 Mielino Kashiwagi | Mierino Kashiwagi (TV Tokyo / 2013) – Tanaka (ep.6–7)
 The Island Teacher | Shima no Sensei (NHK / 2013)
 Doraemon Haha ni Naru: Ōyama Nobuyo Monogatari (NHK / 2015) – Michiko Nomura

TV movies
 Good Job (NHK / 2007)
 Gate of Flesh | Nikutai no Mon (TV Asahi / 2008)
 Dr. Hisayoshi Suma | Gekai Suma Hisayoshi (TV Asahi / 2010) – Yoko Miyamoto
 The Return (Jidaigeki Senmon Channel / TBA)

Dubbing
 Choi Ji-woo
 Winter Sonata (NHK / 2003~2004) – Jeong Yoo-jin
 Beautiful Days (NHK / 2003~2004) – Kim Yeon-soo
 Stairway to Heaven (TV Fuji, BS Fuji / 2004) – Han Jung-suh / Kim Ji-soo
 Everybody Has Secrets (Film / 2004) – Han Seon-yeong
 First Love (NHK / 2005) – Kang Suk-hee
 Now and Forever (Film / 2005) – Han Hye-won
 The Romantic President (Film / 2005) – Choi Eun-soo
 First Kiss (Film / 2005) – Song Yeon-hwa
 Winter Sonata Anime (2009) – Jeong Yoo-jin

References

 www.rottentomatoes.com/celebrity/misato_tanaka
 www.tohokingdom.com/people/misato_tanaka.htm

External links
 

Japanese film actresses
Japanese television actresses
Japanese voice actresses
1977 births
Living people
Voice actresses from Ishikawa Prefecture
Actors from Ishikawa Prefecture
Asadora lead actors